"Píntame De Colores" (Paint Me In Colors) is a song recorded by Cuban-American singer Gloria Estefan for her fourth Spanish-language and eleventh studio album, 90 Millas. The song was written by Gloria Estefan and her husband, Emilio Estefan Jr. and Gaitanes (Alberto y Ricardo Gaitan) and production was credited to Estefan Jr. and Gaitanes. The single was released by SonyBMG in November 2007 digitally as first promotional-only single from 90 Millas to Europe and third overall single to the United States.

With more a tropical feeling mixed with salsa music, this song was completely different from Gloria's previous two singles. The single was first released exclusively in Europe, but later was released at the United States in February 2008 as a promotional single to Spanish-language radio stations.

Distribution
This single was exclusively released at Europe in November 2007 while "Me Odio" was released only to the United States, this single was especially targeted for The Netherlands, where the album 90 Millas, become in the most-successful Spanish album ever released, managing to reach the top spot of the albums chart.

While initial promotion was only to Europe, the single was released to the United States, but no remixes were officially done, and was sent only the album version to Hispanic radio-stations. No music video was made to promote the song.

For the Latin Grammy Awards of 2008, the track was nominated on the field for "Best Tropical Song", the second song for Estefan to be nominated on this category (following "No Me Dejes de Querer" in 2000), and became Estefan's first winning of a Latin Grammy for a song.  She had previously won a Latin Grammy, but it was for a music video - short form; this also became her first Grammy for a song in her entire career, including the Latin and non-Latin Grammy's.

Later, the song was nominated to a Latin Billboard Music Award in the category for "Tropical Airplay Song Of The Year, Female", but she lost to Ivy Queen's song "Dime."

Commercial performance 
The song become in a minor hit for Estefan, being one of the few singles released to Latin music-stations not enter to the Hot Latin Songs chart, her last single made it onto the Top 40 and was a hit in the Latin Tropical format, this last being the only chart in which this song entered to the Top Ten.

Formats and track listings

Credits and personnel 
Credits adapted from the liner notes of the 90 Millas CD and "Píntame De Colores" Promotional CD single.

 Gloria M. Estefan – writer, vocals and mixing
 Emilio Estefan Jr. – writer, record producer and mixing
 Alberto Gaitan – writer, record producer, background vocals, wood sticks and maracas
 Ricardo Gaitan – writer, record producer, background vocals, wood sticks and maracas
 Cheito Quiñonez - background vocals
 Andy García - bongos and bell
 Nelson Gonzalez - tres
 Marco Linares – guitar
 Jesús Cruz – laúd
 Sal Cuevas – bass
 Edwin Bonilla – minor percussion, timbales, güiro and conga
 Danny Ponce & Mike Couzzi – tracking engineers
 Eric Schilling - mixing
 Recorded at Crescent Moon Studios, Miami, Florida.

Chart performance

Weekly charts

References

Spanish-language songs
2007 singles
2008 singles
Gloria Estefan songs
Latin Grammy Award for Best Tropical Song
Songs written by Ricardo Gaitan
Songs written by Alberto Gaitan
Songs written by Gloria Estefan
Songs written by Emilio Estefan
Song recordings produced by Emilio Estefan
2006 songs